Ibn Seena Academy is an Islamic school in Orlando, Florida. It serves students from grades pre-kindergarten to 12th grade.  It currently has articulation agreements with Mishkah University, UCF & USF for its high school program.

History
In August of 2003, Ibn Seena Academy opened its doors to the children of the Greater Orlando area. This Academy is unique because it offers a full academic curriculum together with a practical study of the Quran and Islamic Studies.

External links
Ibn Seena Academy Website

Islamic schools in Florida
Private high schools in Florida
Private middle schools in Florida
Private elementary schools in Florida
Educational institutions established in 2003
2003 establishments in Florida